Albert Gallatin Hoit (December 13, 1809 – December 18, 1856) was an American painter who lived in Boston, Massachusetts. He painted portraits of William Henry Harrison, Daniel Webster and Brenton Halliburton.

Biography

Hoit was born in Sandwich, New Hampshire, December 13, 1809, to Gen. Daniel Hoit and Sally Flanders. Siblings included William Henry Hoit. Hoit graduated from Dartmouth College in 1829.  He married Susan Hanson in 1838; children included Anna M. Hoit.

He "devoted his life to portrait painting, first at Portland, Maine, in 1831, and then in Bangor and Belfast, Maine, and St. John's, N.B. until Boston, Mass., became his permanent home in 1839."  He also travelled in Europe, "Oct. 1842 to July 1844, ... enjoying the galleries of art in Italy, Paris, and London." He created portraits of Pietro Bachi, Johanna Robinson Hazen, J. Eames, and others. He painted a portrait of Daniel Webster "for Paran Stevens, which hung for years in the Revere House, Boston, and now belongs to the Union League Club, New York."

He was affiliated with the Boston Artists' Association; and exhibited at the gallery of the New England Art Union in the 1850s. In 1848, he kept a studio on Tremont Row in Boston, and lived in Roxbury. By 1852 he had moved his studio to Washington Street. He died in Jamaica Plain, December 18, 1856, at age 47.

Works by Hoit are in the collection of the Sandwich Historical Society in New Hampshire, the New Brunswick Museum, the National Gallery of Canada, and the Strawbery Banke Museum in Portsmouth, NH.

References

Image gallery

Further reading
 Obituary. The Crayon, January 1857, p. 29.
 Patricia L. Heard. With Faithfulness and Quiet Dignity: Albert Gallatin Hoit 1809-1856. Concord, N.H.: New Hampshire Historical Society, 1985.
 Albert Gallatin Hoit (1809–1856): The Canadian Paintings. University of New Brunswick Art Centre, 1991.

External links

 WorldCat. Hoit, Albert Gallatin 1809-1856

1809 births
1856 deaths
19th-century American painters
American male painters
American portrait painters
Artists from Boston
19th-century American male artists